Italy sent a delegation to compete at the 1976 Summer Paralympics in Toronto, Ontario, Canada. Its athletes finished twenty fifth in the overall medal count.

Medalists 
The Italian Paralympic team obtained the following medals:

See also 
 1976 Summer Paralympics
 Italy at the 1976 Summer Olympics

References

External links
Media Guide Tokyo 2020 

Nations at the 1976 Summer Paralympics
1976
Summer Paralympics